Geoffrey Evans (born 1940 in England – 20 May 2012 in Dublin) was an English killer who murdered two women in Ireland with an accomplice John Shaw in 1976, and one of the longest-serving prisoners in Ireland. He was known to have planned to rape and kill one woman each week.

The British police had previously investigated the pair in connection with three rapes committed in England in 1974, prompting the men to leave the United Kingdom and travel to Ireland. They planned a series of murders and rapes, which they did by house theft. They were detained in Cork and received a two-year prison sentence for burglary. After 18 months, however, they were released and escaped British prosecution for the rape charges in England by failing to return to the U.K. and traveling through Ireland. In August 1976, in Wicklow, they repeatedly raped and then murdered Elizabeth Plunkett, 23. In September of that year, in Castlebar, they beat, raped and murdered 23-year-old Mary Duffy. On 26 September 1976, both were detained by the Gardaí and later sentenced to life imprisonment for the two murders.

In December 2008, Evans underwent heart surgery, suffered a stroke and fell into a coma. Until June 2010 he remained in hospital care with caution, and then was given temporary release when doctors said he was in a vegetative state. In April 2011 he was transferred to Dublin's St. Mary's Hospital. He died there on 20 May 2012 at the age of 71 or 72 (sources vary). According to the autopsy, the cause of death was sepsis caused by pneumonia.

References 

1940s births
2012 deaths
English rapists
Irish rapists
People convicted of murder by the Republic of Ireland